In mathematics, the Seifert–Van Kampen theorem of algebraic topology (named after Herbert Seifert and Egbert van Kampen), sometimes just called Van Kampen's theorem,  expresses the structure of the fundamental group of a topological space  in terms of the fundamental groups of two open, path-connected subspaces that cover . It can therefore be used for computations of the fundamental group of spaces that are constructed out of simpler ones.

Van Kampen's theorem for fundamental groups 

Let X be a topological space which is the union of two open and path connected subspaces U1, U2. Suppose U1 ∩ U2 is path connected and nonempty, and let x0 be a point in U1 ∩ U2 that will be used as the base of all fundamental groups.

The natural morphism k is an isomorphism.

Usually the morphisms induced by inclusion in this theorem are not themselves injective, and the more precise version of the statement is in terms of pushouts of groups.

Van Kampen's theorem for fundamental groupoids 
Unfortunately, the theorem as given above does not compute the fundamental group of the circle – which is the most important basic example in algebraic topology – because the circle cannot be realised as the union of two open sets with connected intersection. This problem can be resolved by working with the fundamental groupoid  on a set A of base points, chosen according to the geometry of the situation. Thus for the circle, one uses two base points.

This groupoid consists of homotopy classes relative to the end points of paths in X joining points of A ∩ X. In particular, if X is a contractible space, and A consists of two distinct points of X, then  is easily seen to be isomorphic to the groupoid often written  with two vertices and exactly one morphism between any two vertices. This groupoid plays a role in the theory of groupoids analogous to that of the group of integers in the theory of groups. The groupoid  also allows for groupoids a notion of homotopy: it is a unit interval object in the category of groupoids.

The category of groupoids admits all colimits, and in particular all pushouts.

Theorem. Let the topological space X be covered by the interiors of two subspaces X1, X2 and let A be a set which meets each path component of X1, X2 and X0 = X1 ∩ X2. Then A meets each path component of X and the diagram P of morphisms induced by inclusion

is a pushout diagram in the category of groupoids.

This theorem gives the transition from topology to algebra, in determining completely the fundamental groupoid ; one then has to use algebra and combinatorics to determine a fundamental group at some basepoint.

One interpretation of the theorem is that it computes homotopy 1-types. To see its utility, one can easily find cases where X is connected but is the union of the interiors of two subspaces, each with say 402 path components and whose intersection has say 1004 path components. The interpretation of this theorem as a calculational tool for "fundamental groups" needs some development of 'combinatorial groupoid theory'. This theorem implies the calculation of the  fundamental group of the circle as the group of integers, since the group of integers is obtained from the groupoid  by identifying, in the category of groupoids, its two vertices.

There is a version of the last theorem when X is covered by the union of the interiors of a family  of subsets.

The conclusion is that if A meets each path component of all 1,2,3-fold intersections of the sets , then A meets all path components of X and the diagram

of morphisms induced by inclusions is a coequaliser in the category of groupoids.

Equivalent formulations 
Given group presentations:

the amalgamation can be presented as

In category theory,  is the pushout, in the category of groups, of the diagram:

Examples

2-sphere 
One can use Van Kampen's theorem to calculate fundamental groups for topological spaces that can be decomposed into simpler spaces. For example, consider the sphere . Pick open sets  and  where n and s denote the north and south poles respectively. Then we have the property that A, B and A ∩ B are open path connected sets. Thus we can see that there is a commutative diagram including A ∩ B into A and B and then another inclusion from A and B into  and that there is a corresponding diagram of homomorphisms between the fundamental groups of each subspace. Applying Van Kampen's theorem gives the result

However, A and B are both homeomorphic to R2 which is simply connected, so both A and B have trivial fundamental groups.

Wedge sum of spaces 

of the fundamental groups of the two spaces we started with:
.

Orientable genus-g surfaces 

A more complicated example is the calculation of the fundamental group of a genus-n orientable surface S, otherwise known as the genus-n surface group. One can construct S using its standard fundamental polygon. For the first open set A, pick a disk within the center of the polygon. Pick B to be the complement in S of the center point of A. Then the intersection of A and B is an annulus, which is known to be homotopy equivalent to (and so has the same fundamental group as) a circle. Thus the inclusion of  into  sends any generator to the trivial element. However, the inclusion of  into  is not trivial. In order to understand this, first one must calculate . This is easily done as one can deformation retract B (which is S with one point deleted) onto the edges labeled by

This space is known to be the wedge sum of 2n circles (also called a bouquet of circles), which further is known to have fundamental group isomorphic to the free group with 2n generators, which in this case can be represented by the edges themselves: . We now have enough information to apply Van Kampen's theorem. The generators are the loops  (A is simply connected, so it contributes no generators) and there is exactly one relation:

Using generators and relations, this group is denoted

Simple-connectedness 
If X is space that can be written as the  union of two open simply connected sets U and V with U ∩ V non-empty and path-connected, then X is simply connected.

Generalizations
As explained above, this theorem was  extended by Ronald Brown to the non-connected case by using the fundamental groupoid  on a set A of base points.  The theorem for arbitrary covers, with the restriction that A meets all threefold intersections of the sets of the cover, is given in the paper by Brown and Abdul Razak Salleh.  The theorem and proof for the fundamental group, but using some groupoid methods, are also given in  J. Peter May's book.   The version that allows more than two overlapping sets but with A a singleton is also given in Allen Hatcher's book below, theorem 1.20.

Applications of the fundamental groupoid on a set of base points to the Jordan curve theorem, covering spaces, and orbit spaces are given in Ronald Brown's book. In the case of orbit spaces, it is convenient to take A to include all the fixed points of the action. An example here is the conjugation action on the circle.

References to higher-dimensional versions of the theorem which yield some information on homotopy types are given in an article on higher-dimensional group theories and groupoids. Thus a 2-dimensional Van Kampen theorem which computes nonabelian second relative homotopy groups was given by Ronald Brown and Philip J. Higgins. A full account and extensions to all dimensions are given by Brown, Higgins, and Rafael Sivera, while an extension to n-cubes of spaces is given by Ronald Brown and Jean-Louis Loday.

Fundamental groups also appear in algebraic geometry and are the main topic of Alexander Grothendieck's first Séminaire de géométrie algébrique (SGA1). A version of Van Kampen's theorem appears there, and is proved along quite different lines than in algebraic topology, namely by descent theory. A similar proof works in algebraic topology.

See also
 Higher-dimensional algebra
 Higher category theory
 Pseudocircle
 Ronald Brown (mathematician)

Notes

References
 Allen Hatcher, Algebraic topology. (2002) Cambridge University Press, Cambridge, xii+544 pp.  and 
 Peter May, A Concise Course in Algebraic Topology. (1999) University of Chicago Press,  (Section 2.7 provides a category-theoretic presentation of the theorem as a colimit in the category of groupoids).
 Ronald Brown, Groupoids and Van Kampen's theorem, Proc. London Math. Soc. (3) 17 (1967) 385–401.
 Mathoverflow discussion on many base points
 Ronald Brown, Topology and groupoids (2006) Booksurge LLC 
 R. Brown and A. Razak, A Van Kampen theorem for unions of non-connected  spaces, Archiv. Math. 42 (1984) 85–88. (This paper gives probably the optimal version of the theorem, namely  the groupoid version of the theorem for an arbitrary open cover and a set of base points which meets every path component of every 1-.2-3-fold intersections of the sets of the cover.) 
 P.J. Higgins, Categories and groupoids (1971) Van Nostrand Reinhold
 Ronald Brown, Higher-dimensional group theory (2007) (Gives a broad view of higher-dimensional Van Kampen theorems involving multiple groupoids).
  
 Seifert, H., Konstruction drei dimensionaler geschlossener Raume. Berichte Sachs. Akad. Leipzig, Math.-Phys. Kl.  (83) (1931) 26–66.
E. R. van Kampen. On the connection between the fundamental groups of some related spaces. American Journal of Mathematics, vol. 55 (1933), pp. 261–267.
 Brown, R., Higgins, P. J, On the connection between the second relative homotopy groups of some related spaces,  Proc. London Math.  Soc. (3) 36 (1978) 193–212.
Brown, R., Higgins, P. J. and  Sivera, R.. 2011, EMS Tracts in Mathematics Vol.15 (2011) Nonabelian Algebraic Topology: filtered spaces, crossed complexes, cubical homotopy groupoids; (The first of three Parts discusses the applications of the 1- and 2-dimensional versions of the Seifert–van Kampen Theorem. The latter allows calculations of nonabelian second relative homotopy groups, and in fact of homotopy 2-types. The second part applies a Higher Homotopy van Kampen Theorem for crossed complexes, proved in Part III.)
 
 R. Brown,  H. Kamps, T. Porter : A homotopy double groupoid of a Hausdorff space II: a Van Kampen theorem', Theory and Applications of Categories,  14 (2005) 200–220.
 Dylan G.L. Allegretti, Simplicial Sets and Van Kampen's Theorem (Discusses generalized versions of Van Kampen's theorem applied to topological spaces and simplicial sets).
 R. Brown and J.-L. Loday, "Van Kampen theorems for diagrams of spaces",  Topology 26 (1987) 311–334.

External links

Category theory
Higher category theory
Homotopy theory
Theorems in algebraic topology